Ninaivirukkum Varai is a 1999 Indian Tamil-language drama film directed by K. Subash. The film stars Prabhu Deva and Keerthi Reddy, while Anand, Ranjith, Vivek, Sujatha, and Fathima Babu play supporting roles. The film's score and soundtrack are composed by Deva with cinematography by M. V. Panneerselvam. The film released on 5 February 1999.

Plot 
Janakiraman alias Johny is a kindhearted slum dweller who is very fond of his mother. Sandhya is a rich girl staying in a nearby locality. Sandhya meets Johny and befriends him and his other friends as well. Johny has big respect for Sandhya as she treats him with respect despite living in a slum. Slowly, friendship blossoms into love for Johny; however, he does not have the courage to speak up to Sandhya, who treats him as her best friend.

Sada is a local baddie living in the same slum who locks horns with Johny most of the time. One day, Sandhya informs Johny that her parents have decided for her to marry Dinesh, who is their family's friend. Johny understands that Sandhya still views him only as a true friend and decides to hide his love. However, Johny learns from Sada that Dinesh is a big-time womaniser and that Sada was working as a pimp for Dinesh. Sada also discloses that both he and Dinesh are infected with HIV/AIDS. Dinesh plans to marry Sandhya despite knowing about his illness.

Now, Johny plans to cancel the wedding and save Sandhya. Johny meets Dinesh and requests him to cancel the wedding, but Dinesh's henchmen beat Johny and also kill Sada. Johny is accused for Sada's death and is arrested by the police. On the day of Sandhya's wedding, Johny escapes from the police and kills Dinesh in the marriage hall. Johny reveals the truth about Dinesh, and Sandhya thanks him for saving her life. Sandhya praises Johny in front of everyone as her true friend who is ready to go to any extent for her well-being. Johny, although feeling like disclosing his love towards her, decides to hide it as he does not want to break her trust. He is then re-arrested.

Cast 

 Prabhu Deva as Janakiraman (Johny)
 Keerthi Reddy as Sandhya (voice dubbed by Savitha Reddy)
 Sujatha as Janakiraman's mother
 Vivek as Vinod
 Anand as Dinesh
 Ranjith as Sada
 Kumarimuthu as Astrologer
 Pandu as Sub-inspector
 Dhamu as Janakiraman's friend
 Chaplin Balu as Janakiraman's friend
 Japan Kumar as Janakiraman's friend
 Arun Sarath as Janakiraman's friend
 Laxmi Rattan as Anand, Sandhya's father
 Mohan Raman as Dinesh's father
 Raviraj as Police inspector
 Fathima Babu as Sandhya's mother
 Anuja as Sippy
 Poovilangu Mohan as Doctor
 LIC Narasimhan as Director general of police
 Amirthalingam as Tea master
 Harikumar as Singer (uncredited role)

Soundtrack 
Soundtrack is composed by Deva.

Release 
The film received positive reviews from critics, with the reviewer from Indolink.com citing that "Prabhu Deva gets a wonderful script and character that he's comfortable in". A reviewer from Deccan Herald noted "One must commend the director, screenplay writer, the story person for putting this in. It’s quite amazing — the last half hour or more is about AIDS, in very human images. Keerthi Reddy is probably the nicest thing about this film, together with the actor who plays the goonda". A critic from The New Indian Express wrote "but in spite of the ingredients being the usual, the film has its moments, thanks largely to a bubbling Prabhu Deva, whose sense of comic timing is superb".

References 

1990s Tamil-language films
1999 films
Films directed by K. Subash
Films scored by Deva (composer)
HIV/AIDS in Indian films